The Daytime Emmy Award is an American accolade bestowed by the New York–based National Academy of Television Arts and Sciences in recognition of excellence in American daytime television programming.

Programs

Children's Animated Program

Pre-School Children's Animated Program

Special Class Animated Program

Outstanding Children's Series

Special Class - Short Format Daytime Program

Performance

Performer in an Animated Program

Writing and Directing

Writing in a Preschool Program

Writing in a Program

Directing in a Program

Directing in a Preschool Program

Sound and Music

Sound mixing - Animation

Sound Mixing in a Preschool Animated Program

Outstanding Sound Editing – Animation

Sound Editing in a Preschool Animated Program

Original Song

Other

Main Title and Graphic Design

Interactive Media

Casting for an Animated Series or Special

Individual Achievement in Animation

See also
Main
 List of accolades received by Netflix

Others
 List of TCA Awards received by Netflix
 List of BAFTA Awards received by Netflix
 List of Golden Globe Awards received by Netflix
 List of Critics' Choice Awards received by Netflix
 List of Primetime Emmy Awards received by Netflix
 List of Screen Actors Guild Awards received by Netflix
 List of Primetime Creative Arts Emmy Awards received by Netflix

References

Lists of accolades received by Netflix
Daytime Emmy Award winners